The ambiguity effect is a cognitive bias where decision making is affected by a lack of information, or "ambiguity". The effect implies that people tend to select options for which the probability of a favorable outcome is known, over an option for which the probability of a favorable outcome is unknown. The effect was first described by Daniel Ellsberg in 1961.

Examples 
When buying a house, many people choose a fixed-rate mortgage, where the interest rate is set for a specific time frame (typically several years), over a variable-rate mortgage, where the interest rate fluctuates with the market, possibly from one month to the next. This is the case even though a variable rate mortgage has statistically been shown to save money.

As an example, consider a bucket containing 30 balls. The balls are either red, black or white. Ten of the balls are red, and the remaining 20 are either black or white, with all combinations of black and white being equally likely. In option X, drawing a red ball wins a person $100, and in option Y, drawing a black ball wins them $100. The probability of picking a winning ball is the same for both options X and Y. In option X, the probability of selecting a winning ball is 1 in 3 (10 red balls out of 30 total balls). In option Y, despite the fact that the number of black balls is uncertain, the probability of selecting a winning ball is also 1 in 3. This is because the number of black balls is equally distributed among all possibilities between 0 and 20. The difference between the two options is that in option X, the probability of a favorable outcome is known, but in option Y, the probability of a favorable outcome is unknown ("ambiguous").

In spite of the equal probability of a favorable outcome, people have a greater tendency to select a ball under option X, where the probability of selecting a winning ball is perceived to be more certain. The uncertainty as to the number of black balls means that option Y tends to be viewed less favorably. Despite the fact that there could possibly be twice as many black balls as red balls, people tend not to want to take the opposing risk that there may be fewer than 10 black balls. The "ambiguity" behind option Y means that people tend to favor option X, even when the probability is the same.

A more realistic example might be the way people invest money. A risk-averse investor might tend to put their money into "safe" investments such as government bonds and bank deposits, as opposed to more volatile investments such as stocks and funds. Even though the stock market is likely to provide a significantly higher return over time, the investor might prefer the "safe" investment in which the return is known, instead of the less predictable stock market in which the return is not known. The ambiguity effect is a possible explanation why people are reluctant to adopt new practices in the work place.

It is human to avoid ambiguous knowledge - to assume things are knowable when they are not. This is related to the clustering illusion. When presented with large amounts of confounding variables, people still tend to claim knowledge of the unknowable.  This produces cognitive dissonance which when avoided leads people to try to change venues to something with more certainty.

Explanation 
One possible explanation of the effect is that people have a rule of thumb (heuristic) to avoid options where information is missing. This will often lead them to seek out the missing information. In many cases, though, the information cannot be obtained. The effect is often the result of calling some particular missing piece of information to the person's attention.

See also
 Ambiguity aversion
 Black swan theory
 Choice under uncertainty
 Ellsberg paradox
 Prospect theory
 Risk aversion

References

Cognitive biases